Leontiy Ivanovich Sivtsov (1872–1919) was a church reader who lived in Unalaska. Along with Aleksey Yachmenev, who like Sivtsov was Aleut himself, Sivtsov accompanied Waldemar Jochelson on his 1909–1910 ethnological studies on the Aleut.

References
 Bergsland, Knut (1994). Aleut Dictionary = Unangam Tunudgusii: an unabridged lexicon of the Aleutian, Pribilof, and Commander Islands Aleut language. Fairbanks, AK: Alaska Native Language Center, University of Alaska. . P. viii

Alaska Native people
American people of Aleut descent
People from Unalaska, Alaska
1872 births
1919 deaths